The 2023 Louisiana lieutenant gubernatorial election will take place on October 14, 2023, to elect the next Lt. Governor of Louisiana. Incumbent Republican Lieutenant Governor Billy Nungesser is seeking a third consecutive term.

Under Louisiana's jungle primary system, all candidates will appear on the same ballot, regardless of party, and voters may vote for any candidate, regardless of their party affiliation.

Candidates

Republican candidates

Declared
Elbert Guillory, former state senator (2009–2016)
Billy Nungesser, incumbent lieutenant governor

Withdrew
Stuart Bishop, state representative

Declined
John Fleming, former U.S. Representative for Louisiana's 4th congressional district (2009–2017) (running for state treasurer)
Scott McKnight, state representative (running for state treasurer)
Jennifer Van Vrancken, Jefferson Parish councilor

References

2023
Lieutenant gubernatorial
Louisiana